Fleming v Beevers [1994] 1 NZLR 385 is a cited case in New Zealand regarding  the doctrine of part performance.

Background
Fleeming and Beevers were in a de facto relationship for over 20 years. In 1989, the couple purchased a house in Queenstown, with Beevers financing his half by cashing in his superannuation policy, with Fleeming borrowing the money for her half, which needed a guarantee from Beevers to secure the loan.

During the conveyancing process, both parties promised to leave their share in the house to the other partner in their will.

Beevers never got around to drafting a new will, and a few months after buying the house, he died. Without a new will, his share of the house would have been disposed under his last will, which left everything to his three children from his previous marriage, with nothing left to Fleeming.

Fleeming sued the estate for Beevers' half share in the house, as well as for a piano that he had promised to leave her.

Held
The court awarded Fleming the share in the house, but not the piano.

References

Court of Appeal of New Zealand cases
New Zealand contract case law
1994 in case law
1994 in New Zealand law